U-35 (S185) is a  Type 212A submarine of the German Navy. She is the fifth ship of the class to enter service.

She was laid down in August 2007 by Howaldtswerke, Kiel, launched in November 2011 and commissioned on 23 March 2015.  She is  under the patronage of the city of Zweibrücken, in Rhineland-Palatinate. Her sponsor is Sigrid Hubert-Reichling, wife of the Lord Mayor of Zweibrücken, Helmut Reichling.

Service 
U-35 is currently part of the 1st Ubootgeschwader, based in Eckernförde.  In January 2015 Der Spiegel reported that significant problems had been found with U-35 and her sister submarine U-36. The drive shaft system, battery, radar and the radio buoy were all found to be malfunctioning.

In October 2017 U-35 entered dock at the ThyssenKrupp Marine Systems yard at, Kiel for inspection after damaging her rudder during deep water testing in the Kattegat off Kristiansand. She had been operating in Norwegian waters prior to 15 October carrying out operational tests.

From 12 June 2021 to 14 December 2021, U-35 participated in Operation Irini.

References 

Type 212 submarines of the German Navy
2011 ships
Submarines of Germany
Ships built in Kiel